WWE Heat (formerly known as Sunday Night Heat and also known as Heat) is an American professional wrestling television program that was produced by World Wrestling Entertainment (WWE) and aired from August 2, 1998 to May 30, 2008. Originally produced under the World Wrestling Federation (WWF) banner, it aired on USA Network (1998–2000), MTV (2000–2003), and TNN/Spike TV (2003–2005) in the United States, CTV Sportsnet in Canada, and Channel 4, Sky1, and Sky Sports in the United Kingdom. From 2002, due to the WWE brand extension, Heat served as a supplementary show to the Raw brand, focusing more exclusively on its mid-card performers and matches, and was recorded before the week's television taping of Raw.

Heat was most recently streamed on WWE.com on Friday afternoons for North American viewers from 2005 to 2008. However, the show was still televised internationally and showed in the United Kingdom on Channel 4 and then later on Sky Sports 3, Australia on Fox8, India on TEN Sports, Germany on Premiere Sport Portal, France on Action, Spain on Sportmania and C+ Deportes -both channels from Digital+, the Middle East on ShowSports4, the Philippines on Jack TV, and Japan on J Sports. The final episode was uploaded to WWE.com. The show was replaced internationally with WWE Vintage Collection, a program featuring classic matches.

On May 7, 2018, the first 52 episodes of WWE Heat were made available to stream on the WWE Network.

History

Early format

The show was originally introduced on the USA Network on August 2, 1998 in the United States. The one-hour show would be broadcast on Sunday nights, being taped earlier in the week after Raw. It was the second primary program of the WWF's weekly television show line-up, serving as a supplement to the Monday Night Raw program. Heat would feature a format similar to that of Monday Night Raw, in that continuing feuds from the previous week would progress during the show, and the following day's Monday Night Raw would be heavily promoted. On scheduled WWF pay-per-view event nights, Heat would also serve as a preview show to the events.  The show was initially signed for only 6 episodes, but proved to be very popular and was continued.

1999–2002

With the premiere of SmackDown! in August 1999, coverage of Heat was significantly reduced in favor of the newer show. The debut of SmackDown! also led to Heat being taped before SmackDown! with matches for WWF syndication programs like Jakked/Metal being taped before Raw broadcasts. When SmackDown! premiered, Heat briefly became a complete weekly summary show, featuring occasional interviews and music videos. After only a few weeks following the format change, Heat began airing exclusive matches again.

Occasionally, special editions of the show aired heavily promoted. For Super Bowl XXXIII in 1999, Heat aired as Halftime Heat on the USA Network during halftime of the Super Bowl. These specials ended following the show's move to MTV in 2000. When the show started airing on MTV in late 2000, it was broadcast live from WWF New York. WWF personalities and performers would appear at the restaurant as special guests while Michael Cole and Tazz provided commentary to matches.

United Kingdom (2000–2001)
The United Kingdom's coverage Heat began in January 2000, when Channel 4 started broadcasting the show at 4pm on Sundays, as a part of T4 – which also included broadcasting four WWF PPVs a year. These one-hour shows were a magazine-type show, usually featuring three or four brief matches as well as highlights from Raw and SmackDown!. As with the North American airing, exclusive matches taped before SmackDown! were aired on this version of the show.

A separate commentary team was used on airings in the United Kingdom, with references aimed more at that specific audience. During commentary, Raw and SmackDown! were referred to as taking place on Friday and Saturday respectively, which were the days they were broadcast in the United Kingdom on Sky Sports – as opposed to the manner in which the two programs were often referred to by the North American broadcast dates of Monday and Thursday. The two-person announce team was a mix of individuals including Kevin Kelly, Michael Cole, Michael Hayes and Jonathan Coachman. During the middle of 2000, Heat started to get moved around the Channel 4 schedule, usually between the afternoon and midnight. Towards the end of 2000, the show was permanently moved to being broadcast in the early-hours of Monday mornings. The show stayed in the time-slot until December 2001 when Channel 4's deal with the WWF expired in the United Kingdom.

2002–2005
In April 2002, the show returned to its original filming schedule, again before Raw. Eventually, the live from WWF New York format was retired, and was replaced as being the Raw brand's second show. Ratings were still moderate for Heat, although the show lost some popularity once SmackDown! began to air. This version also featured highlights from that week's Raw, and the name change was introduced to the show in May 2002, when it became known as WWE Sunday Night Heat (the May 5, 2002 episode, along with the Insurrextion United Kingdom-exclusive pay-per-view held the same day, were the last broadcasts of any kind under the WWF name). Heat returned to the United Kingdom and Ireland in January 2003 on Sky One (with repeats on Sky Sports), though the coverage became Sky Sports exclusive in January 2005 along with most of WWE's programming. In the United States, Heat stayed with MTV until March 2003 when it was transferred over to TNN/Spike TV. It stayed in that timeslot until the contract with Viacom was up.

2005–2008

Heat and Velocity were not picked up by the USA Network when WWE moved its programming over to that network in October 2005, leaving Americans no way to watch WWE weekend shows on television. To solve this problem, WWE decided to stream the shows on their website exclusively for the U.S. audience, with new editions posted every Friday afternoon. Additionally, prior to every PPV event, WWE would continue to air a live bonus 30-minute Heat pre-show on the PPV channel. Backlash 2006 would be the final PPV event to feature a live Heat pre-show before that particular version of Heat was discontinued until WrestleMania XXVIII in 2012 when that pre-show format was revived albeit in one-hour under the name WWE Kickoff. Sunday Night Heat was soon renamed to WWE Heat, as it no longer aired on Sundays.

Heat was still shown internationally to fulfill international programming commitments. When WWE went high definition in January 2008, Heat began using the same HD set as Raw, SmackDown, and ECW. After 10 years of programming and 513 episodes, the final episode of WWE Heat was uploaded to WWE.com on May 30, 2008. It was the most watched episode of Heat since it debuted on WWE.com. The show was replaced internationally with a new show featuring classic matches, called WWE Vintage Collection.

Legacy
At the 2019 Royal Rumble it was announced that WWE would be bringing back Halftime Heat featuring superstars from NXT during the Super Bowl LIII halftime show.

Notable championship matches
Though the majority of title changes would take place on Raw, SmackDown!, or pay-per-view events, the WWF Championship changed hands on a special Halftime Heat that aired during the half-time of Super Bowl XXXIII on January 31, 1999 when Mankind defeated The Rock in an empty arena match to win the title. This special episode received the highest rating of Sunday Night Heat with a rating of 6.6.

Additionally, the Light Heavyweight Championship changed hands on Heat on three occasions. The first took place on the February 13, 2000 airing when Essa Rios (in his first appearance under that name and with the debuting Lita) defeated Gillberg. The second change saw Crash Holly defeat Dean Malenko on the March 18, 2001 episode. In the final change, the debuting Jerry Lynn defeated Crash Holly on a live edition before the Backlash pay-per-view on April 29, 2001.

On the July 13, 2003, episode Triple H defended the World Heavyweight Championship on Sunday Night Heat against Maven. This was the first time that the title was ever defended on the show.

Commentators and hosts
There have been many commentators in the history of Heat. Industry veterans and Raw broadcasters Jim Ross and Jerry Lawler have done commentary on the show. The show was also the launchpad for Shane McMahon's on-camera career in WWE, originally placed in the role of a commentator for the program. In October 2000, the show was hosted by Rebecca Budig and MTV VJ/Rapper DJ Skribble when it moved from USA Network to MTV.

Often wrestlers would take the role of color commentators on the show with Al Snow, Tommy Dreamer, Raven, and D'Lo Brown all holding this position mostly as a replacement for an announcer who was unavailable. During the show's run on MTV, Diva Lita also served as a commentator following her major neck injury.

Before the WWE-produced Extreme Championship Wrestling reunion pay-per-view One Night Stand 2005 took place, a special Extreme Heat episode was broadcast and hosted by Jonathan Coachman and Michael Cole.

During one episode when Jonathan Coachman was unavailable, former ECW announcer (and then-lead Raw announcer) Joey Styles took part in the show. Styles then quit in storyline, however, on the following Monday's' Raw, meaning Grisham ran the show alone.

Commentators

Television and Internet schedules
United States
USA Network – Sunday Nights (1998–2000)
MTV – Sunday Nights (2000–2003)
TNN/Spike TV – Sunday Nights (2003–2005)
WWE.com – Fridays (2005–2008)
United Kingdom
Channel 4 – Sunday Afternoons (2000)
Channel 4 – Sunday Nights (2000–2001)
Sky One – Sunday Mornings & Sky Sports 3 – Sunday Nights (2003–2004)
Sky Sports 3 – Sunday Mornings/Sunday Nights (2005)
Sky Sports 3 – Sunday Mornings (2005–2008)
Canada
CTV Sportsnet

See also
 WWE Superstars
 WWE Raw
 WWE Velocity
 WWE Bottom Line
 WWE Experience

References

External links
 

1998 American television series debuts
2005 web series debuts
2008 web series endings
2008 American television series endings
MTV original programming
Spike (TV network) original programming
USA Network original programming
Heat
Heat
WWE Raw
American non-fiction web series